Florentine is a rural locality in the local government areas of Central Highlands and Derwent Valley in the Central and South-east regions of Tasmania. The 2016 census determined a population of nil for the state suburb of Florentine.

History
Florentine is a confirmed suburb/locality.

Geography
The Florentine River flows through from south-west to north.

Road infrastructure
The B61 route (Gordon River Road) passes through the south-east corner. Route C607 (Scotts Peak Dam Road) starts at an intersection with B61 on the southern boundary and runs away to the south.

References

Localities of Central Highlands Council
Localities of Derwent Valley Council
Towns in Tasmania